Jiří Mihola (born 1 June 1972) is a Czech politician and former member of the Chamber of Deputies for the Christian and Democratic Union – Czechoslovak People's Party (KDU-ČSL) fom October 2013 to October 2021.

References

External links
Official website

1972 births
KDU-ČSL MPs
Living people
Politicians from Brno
Members of the Chamber of Deputies of the Czech Republic (2017–2021)
Members of the Chamber of Deputies of the Czech Republic (2013–2017)
Masaryk University alumni